Universal Music Publishing Group (UMPG) is a North American music publishing company and is part of the Universal Music Group. It was formerly known as MCA Music Publishing until it merged with PolyGram.

Universal Music Publishing is the world's second largest music publishing company, behind Sony Music Publishing. UMPG's catalogue consists of over three million songs, with offices in over 30 countries.

History
In 1998, Seagram acquired PolyGram for $10.4 billion. PolyGram's music business was merged into Seagram's MCA Records. The merger was effected in January 1999, forming a new company named Universal Music Group. The merger also included both record labels' music publishers. The PolyGram catalog included Dick James Music, Welk Music, Cedarwood Publishing, and Sweden Music. MCA had been in the music publishing business since 1964, when it acquired Lou Levy's Leeds Music.

In August 2000, UMPG acquired Rondor Music from Herb Alpert and Jerry Moss for roughly $400 million. It included former music publishing arms of A&M Records, I.R.S. Records, Stax Records, and Shelter Records, as well as Sea of Tunes. The purchase added 60,000 copyrights to Universal's library.

In 2006, Universal Music Publishing Group acquired BMG Music Publishing from Bertelsmann Music Group for €1.63 billion, back then the third largest publishing group in the world, making Universal Music the largest music publisher in the world. It included the catalogs of Éditions Durand and Casa Ricordi and former music publishing arms of Benson Records and Zomba. As part of the acquisition of BMG Music Publishing, Universal divested the catalogues of Zomba UK (and the European rights to Zomba USA), Rondor UK, 19 Music and BBC to a new company named Imagem (now part of Concord Music Publishing).

On May 7, 2013, UMPG acquired American music publisher Criterion Music Corporation.

On January 1, 2015, Jody Gerson was named the Chairman and CEO of Universal Music Publishing Group, becoming the first female to run a major music publishing company. On December 3, 2015, she was named Executive of the Year by Billboard Magazine in its Women in Music issue. Sony/ATV Music Publishing overtook Universal Music Publishing as the world's largest music publisher in 2013 after acquiring EMI Music Publishing.

Services
UMPG administers the 60,000 title Rondor Music Catalog and also owns or administers a multitude of others including: Interscope and Def Jam Music, WildBrain, Amazon Studios and Metro-Goldwyn-Mayer, All Nations Music, Charlie Daniels, Casa Ricordi, Matraca Berg, DreamWorks Animation, HBO, Paramount Global (excluding CBS and Showtime Networks), Warner Bros., Sesame Street, Lionsgate, Disney Music Group, Forerunner Music, Epitaph Records, Greenwich/Barry, Momentum Publishing, and John Philips. UMPG also owns or administers the works of Leonard Bernstein and Henry Mancini (non-USA), and Dsign Music.

International
Universal Music Publishing Group Australia & NZ is based in Sydney, New South Wales, Australia. Marianna Annas, former Head of ABC Music Publishing until January 2020, is  Vice President, Commercial & Creative at the company,

References

External links
Universal Music Publishing Group US
Universal Music Publishing Group UK
Universal Music Publishing Group Australia & NZ
Universal Music Publishing Group Italy
Universal Music Publishing Group Germany
Universal Music Publishing Group Netherlands
Universal Music Publishing Group Spain
Universal Music Publishing Group Sweden

Publishing
Music publishing companies of the United States
Companies based in Los Angeles County, California
Companies based in Santa Monica, California